Carl Carlton (born May 21, 1953) is an American R&B, soul, and funk singer-songwriter, best known for his hits "Everlasting Love" and "She's a Bad Mama Jama (She's Built, She's Stacked)".

Career
Carlton was born in Detroit, Michigan, and began his career in the mid-1960s as "Little Carl" Carlton. It was a marketing ploy to capitalize on some vocal similarities to Stevie Wonder, who recorded under the name "Little Stevie Wonder" in the early 1960s. His first recordings were for Lando Records, for which he recorded some minor local hits, including "So What" and "Don't You Need a Boy Like Me". 

In 1968, Don D. Robey signed Carlton to the Back Beat Record label, which Robey had started in 1957. Shortly after signing with the label, Carlton relocated to Houston, Texas, to be closer to his new label. His first single with the label, "Competition Ain't Nothing" became a huge hit on the UK northern soul scene after its release on the UK Action label. Carlton finally saw major success in the United States with a cover version of Robert Knight's "Everlasting Love". This song went to number 6 in 1974 on the US Billboard Hot 100, and number 11 on the Billboard R&B chart.

Robey sold his labels to ABC Records in 1972. Beginning in 1976, Carlton became embroiled in a royalty dispute with ABC Records that caused him to stop recording for some time. He then signed with Mercury Records in 1977, but only released one single on that label. Carlton was unable to land a new recording contract for several years until Leon Haywood helped him get a singles deal with 20th Century Records.

A Haywood-penned single, "She's a Bad Mama Jama (She's Built, She's Stacked)", became a major hit, peaking at number 2 on the soul chart and earning Carlton a Grammy Award nomination for Best R&B Vocal Performance, Male in 1982. The track peaked at number 34 in the UK Singles Chart. Carlton's subsequent album, Carl Carlton, went gold in 1981. "She's a Bad Mama Jama" has since become a staple of compilation albums and soundtracks and is often sampled in rap music.

Carlton released several more albums in the 1980s but had only a few minor R&B hits. After 1985's Private Property, he did not release another album until 1994's Main Event, which also failed to chart.

In late 2002, Carlton appeared with many R&B stars on the "Rhythm, Love, and Soul" edition of the PBS series American Soundtrack. His performance of "Everlasting Love" was included on the accompanying live album that was released in 2004.

On August 1, 2010, Carlton released his first gospel single entitled "God Is Good". On April 16, 2011, Carlton was nominated for a Detroit Music Award in the "Outstanding Gospel/Christian Vocalist" category.

Discography

Albums

Singles

Television appearances

References

External links

1953 births
20th-century African-American male singers
21st-century African-American male singers
Living people
African-American male songwriters
American soul musicians
American child singers
American rhythm and blues singer-songwriters
ABC Records artists
Northern soul musicians
Singers from Detroit
Singer-songwriters from Michigan